Braidy Industries is an Ashland, Kentucky-based company, planning to become an aluminum alloys manufacturer providing aluminum for the automotive and the food and beverage industries. In October 2020 Braidy Industries announced that it was changing its name to Unity Aluminum.

Subsidiaries
Braidy Industries, Inc. owns Braidy Atlas, a start-up that has designed and engineered the first aluminum rolling mill to be built in the United States in nearly 40 years.  It also owns Veloxint, an MIT incubated technology company and NanoAL, a Northwestern University incubated technology company.

History
Braidy Industries was founded by Craig T. Bouchard who wanted to create eco-friendly aluminum alloys, and named after one of his daughters. The industry demand was bending towards stronger and lighter materials and the company was founded to accommodate the market gap created by this generational shift.

Braidy Industries started off with an initial project of a fully integrated aluminum rolling mill in the Greenup County, Kentucky, comprising a 2.5 million square-foot area. The site, relocated to neighboring Boyd County, Kentucky is located in Eastern Kentucky and the facility costs were estimated to be around $1.6 billion.

The site for the mill is located near the Ohio River and the CSX railroad, as well as I-64, which connects the site to various automotive plants within 300 miles around the region. This advantage allows the site to utilize the just-in-time approach.

The company is working with the Ashland Alliance and the Kentucky Economic Development Finance Authority (KEDFA) as a part of the Kentucky Business Investment program based on which they received up to $10 million in tax incentives.

Joint venture with RUSAL 
In April 2019 Braidy announced a joint project with RUSAL, a Russian aluminum company partially owned by the oligarch Oleg Deripaska.  The project is to develop the mill site in Ashland, Kentucky "to produce flat-rolled aluminum products for the U.S. automotive industry," according to a company press release.

Founder 
Bouchard litigated to remove the directors in January 2020. In February 2020, Braidy Industries announced that they were reviewing whether the company founder used company money while he was the firm's CEO. A third-party firm was hired by the directors involved in the Delaware litigation to conduct a review. Bouchard disputed the claims in the Delaware Chancery Court, and the claims were then dropped.  Foster stepped in as acting president and CEO. The company announced it
had amicably settled the lawsuit and repurchased Bouchard's shares for $6 million.

2020 pandemic
During the 2020 COVID-19 pandemic, the company received between $1 million and $2 million in federally backed small business loans from Community Trust Bank as part of the Paycheck Protection Program. They stated it would help them retain 65 employees.

References

External links
Official website

Manufacturing companies of the United States
Companies based in Kentucky
Ashland, Kentucky